The 2015 season for  began in January with the Tour Down Under. As a UCI WorldTeam, they were automatically invited and obligated to send a squad to every event in the UCI World Tour.

In March 2015 the team confirmed that Riis had been removed from active duty due to differences between Riis and Tinkov. Media reports had initially indicated that Riis had been suspended when he did not appear at Milan–San Remo as planned, and that this was due to a disappointing start to the season for the team. On 29 March, it was announced that Riis had been released by the team. News reports cited the "tumultuous relationship" and "difference in character" between Riis and Tinkov as the reason for Riis's departure.

Team roster

Riders who joined the team for the 2015 season

Riders who left the team during or after the 2014 season

Season victories

National, Continental and World champions 2015

Footnotes

References

External links
 

2015 road cycling season by team
Tinkoff (cycling team)
2015 in Danish sport
2015 in Russian sport